Anbaran Rural District is in Anbaran  District of Namin County, Ardabil province, Iran. At the census of 2006, its population was 807 in 208 households; there were 766 inhabitants in  234 households at the following census of 2011; and in the most recent census of 2016, the population of the rural district was 1,196 in 392 households. The largest of its three villages was Anbaran-e Olya, with 933 people.

References 

Namin County

Rural Districts of Ardabil Province

Populated places in Ardabil Province

Populated places in Namin County